Evoor is a village by the side of NH47 near Haripad in Karthikappally taluk Alappuzha district.

Location
Almost midway between Thiruvananthapuram and Kochi, it is 40 Kilometers south of Alappuzha in the Onattukara area next to Cheppad railway station. The area is geographically divided into North, South and East. Evoor is bound by Ramapuram on the west, Cheppad on the north, Pathiyoor on the south and the wetland Puncha on the East.

Transportation
Kayamkulam -Ernakulam coastal railway line passes through the entire length of the village.

Climate
The climate is tropical wet with heavy rains during the monsoons. The topography of the land is plain with white sea sand like earth that lacks nutrients.

Woven mats of the area made of "thazha" were once famous.

Places of Worship
It is famous for the ancient Sri Krishnaswamy temple the ten-day annual festival of which attracts large number of devotees. Around this temple are settled exotic clans who attend to different daily rituals of the temple like cleaning, playing musical drums, conch blowing, garland making, sandal paste making and conducting poojas. There is a Christian Church called the St Marys Orthodox Church located in Evoor South .

Celebrities

Eminent persons of the locality include famous Thullal artist Evoor Damodaran Nair, novelist Evoor C. K, noted poet Evoor Parameswaran and senior civil servants like Shri. Varrier of Indian Railways, Anandan of Indian Statistical Service and Mathew George of Telecom,K.K Sreedharan Pillai a freedom fighter. Evoor has excellent teams of chenda vidwans and kathakali artists who are famous across the State. The annual temple festival and the boat race at the Evoor Puncha are great social events and attract many visitors.

Schools
The only presence of Government is by way of three government run lower primary schools. Deshabandhu Vayanashala located in Evoor North had a great treasure of valuable books including compositions on palm leaves providing succor to the knowledge hungry youth of yore. With the advent of Internet Deshabandhu too like other rural libraries has become just a symbol of a rich heritage.

Economy
The social milieu of the village makes interesting patterns. The economy is basically agrarian with not much divide between the rich and the poor. Gulf money has made dents on the once accepted social hierarchy.

Demographics
Though Nairs were once the predominant class, now the Ezhavas have gained both financial and social edge. The NSS Karayogams and the SNDP Sakhas have had significant contribution in the social and cultural progress of the members of the respective communities. The Syrian Christians were always in minority and a culturally distinct group. Most of them have migrated to cities. There a few families of Tamil Brahmins around the Evoor templeഅ and at least two Nampoothiri Illams of repute in Evoor. Almost all the members of the backward and scheduled communities have progressed considerably thanks to the enlightened community leaders of the locality and the influence of progressive political outlook.

Politics
Politically the locality is predominantly left oriented.

2014 Conversion Controversy
During December 2014 the village was caught in a controversy with a few dalit Christians getting reconverted as dalit Hindus under the aegis of Vishwa Hindu Parishad. However, later it was reported that they were practicing Hindus even before re conversion.

References

Villages in Alappuzha district